Thomas Dolak (born March 25, 1979) is a retired Czech-born German professional ice hockey player. He last played for Dusseldorfer EG in the Deutsche Eishockey Liga (DEL).

Career statistics

References

External links

1979 births
Living people
Sportspeople from Zlín
Hamburg Freezers players
German ice hockey forwards
Kingston Frontenacs players
North Bay Centennials players
Kassel Huskies players
München Barons players
Hannover Scorpions players
Düsseldorfer EG players
EHC Freiburg players
Czechoslovak emigrants to Germany
German expatriate sportspeople in Canada
German expatriate ice hockey people